Grace may refer to:

Places

United States

 Grace, Idaho, a city
 Grace (CTA station), Chicago Transit Authority's Howard Line, Illinois
 Little Goose Creek (Kentucky), location of Grace post office
 Grace, Carroll County, Missouri, an unincorporated community
 Grace, Laclede County, Missouri, an unincorporated community
 Grace, Mississippi, an unincorporated community
 Grace, Montana, an unincorporated community
 Grace, Hampshire County, West Virginia
 Grace, Roane County, West Virginia

Elsewhere
 Grace (lunar crater), on the Moon
 Grace, a crater on Venus

People with the name
 Grace (given name), a feminine name, including a list of people and fictional characters
 Grace (surname), a surname, including a list of people with the name

Religion

Theory and practice 
 Grace (prayer), a prayer of thanksgiving said before or after a meal
 Divine grace, a theological term present in many religions
 Grace in Christianity, the benevolence shown by God toward humankind

Institutions 
 Grace Cathedral (disambiguation) 
 Grace Church (disambiguation)
 Grace Bible College (disambiguation)
 Grace Christian College, Quezon City, Philippines
 Grace College & Seminary, Winona Lake, Indiana
 Grace University, Omaha, Nebraska

Arts, entertainment, and media

Films
 Grace (2009 film), a 2009 horror film
 Grace (2014 film), a 2014 drama film starring Annika Marks

Literature
 "Grace" (short story), a 1914 short story by James Joyce from Dubliners
 Grace (play), a 2006 play by Mick Gordon and A. C. Grayling
 Grace, 2008 play by Sophie Dingemans about Grace Oakeshott

Music

Albums
 Grace (Jeff Buckley album), 1994
 Grace (Ketil Bjørnstad album), 2001
 Grace (Simon Webbe album), 2006
 Grace (Mandy Capristo album), 2012
 Grace, by Wild Strawberries, 1991
 Grace, by Margaret Becker, 1995
 Grace, by Tribes of Neurot, 1999
 Grace by Lee Soo-young, 2006
 Grace by Grace Kelly, 2011

Songs
 "Grace" (Jeff Buckley song), 1994 
 "Grace" (Supergrass song), a 2002
 "Grace" (Apocalyptica song), 2007
 "Grace" (Miss Kittin song), 2008
 "Grace" (Simon Webbe song), 2007
 "Grace" (Phil Wickham song), 2006
 "Grace" (Will Young song), 2008 
 "Grace" (Ed Kowalczyk song), 2010
 "Grace" (Lewis Capaldi song), 2018
 "Grace" (Lil Baby song), 2020
 "Grace" (Marcus Mumford song), 2022
 "Grace", an Irish ballad about Grace Gifford
 "Grace", a 1967 song by Country Joe and the Fish from the album Electric Music for the Mind and Body
 "Grace", a 1981 song by Sylvia St. James from the album Echoes & Images
 "Grace", a 1998 song by Robbie Williams from the album I've Been Expecting You
 "Grace", a 1999 song by Jars of Clay from the album If I Left the Zoo
 "Grace", a 2008 song by U2 from the album All That You Can't Leave Behind
 "Grace", a 2008 song by Parachute Band from the album Technicolour
 "Grace", a 2009 song by Lamb of God from the album Wrath
 "Grace", a 2010 song by The View from the album Bread and Circuses
 "Grace", a 2011 song by Nerina Pallot from the album Year of the Wolf
 "Grace", a 2018 song by Bebe Rexha from the album Expectations

Other uses in music
 Grace (band), a 1990s dance music group
 Grace note, a kind of music notation
 The Grace (group), a South Korean girl group
 Saygrace (formerly Grace), an Australian singer and songwriter

Television
 Grace (TV series), a 2021 British crime drama series
 "Grace" (Falling Skies), a 2011 episode of the science fiction drama Falling Skies
 "Grace" (Homeland), a 2011 episode of the TV series Homeland
 "Grace" (Skins), a 2011 episode of the UK TV series Skins
 "Grace" (Stargate SG-1), a 2004 episode of the TV series Stargate SG-1

Other uses in arts, entertainment, and media
 Grace (comics), a list of comics that use the name Grace
 Grace (photograph), the Minnesota state photograph
 Le Bénédicité (Grace), a painting by Jean-Baptiste-Siméon Chardin

Brands and enterprises
 Grace (food company), the brand name for Grace Kennedy Limited, a Caribbean food company
 Grace (restaurant), a restaurant in Chicago, Illinois
 Grace Bio-Labs, supplier of pharmaceutical, biomedical, and biochemical research products, Bend, Oregon, U.S.
 W. R. Grace and Company, a United States-based chemical conglomerate

Organizations
 Godly Response to Abuse in the Christian Environment, a Virginia organization formed to assist evangelical groups in confronting sexual abuse
 Grass Roots Art and Community Effort, American non-profit organization

Transportation
 Grace (1811 ship), a ship destroyed by fire in Struys Bay, South Africa in 1822
 Grace, the American codename for the Aichi B7A, a World War II Japanese bomber aircraft
 Honda Grace, Japanese name for the Honda City, a compact car
 Hyundai Grace, a minivan built by Hyundai Motor Company
 , a Panamanian coastal tanker, launched 1941
 Grace 1, an Iranian oil tanker seized by the UK off Gibraltar during the 2019–20 Persian Gulf crisis

Other uses
 Grace Gates, at Lord's Cricket Ground in London, England
 Grace (plotting tool), software
 Grace (style), a form of address
 GRACE and GRACE-FO, space missions
 Grace period, extra time to fulfill an obligation
 Tropical Storm Grace, storms assigned the name Grace

See also

 Grace Academy (disambiguation)
 Grace Hospital (disambiguation)
 Gracey (disambiguation)
 Gracie (disambiguation)
 The Grace (disambiguation), includes The Graces